"Just You and Me, Darling" is a song written by James Brown and recorded by Brown and The Famous Flames. Released as the B-side of Brown's 1961 cover of "I Love You Yes I Do", it charted #17 R&B. It also appeared on the album The Amazing James Brown.

References

James Brown songs
The Famous Flames songs
Songs written by James Brown
1961 singles
1961 songs